The Belgrave Hospital for Children in Kennington, London, United Kingdom was a voluntary hospital founded in Pimlico, London in 1866. A new hospital  building was constructed between 1899 and 1926 at 1 Clapham Road from a design by Charles Holden. It was designated a Grade II* listed building in 1981 and is currently residential flats.

History
The hospital was designed by Charles Holden and was built in stages between 1899 and 1926. It joined the National Health Service in 1948 as part of the King's College Hospital Group. It closed in 1985 and remained disused until it was converted into residential accommodation in the 1990s.

Notable staff 

 Arthur Bankart, orthopaedic surgeon best known for describing the Bankart lesion and Bankart repair for shoulder dislocation.

 Frances Ethel Barwell RRC, (1868-1963), Matron 1899- until at least 1928. Barwell trained at The London Hospital under Eva Luckes between 1894-1896. She was given leave of absence to serve in France, March 1915-April 1919  as a Sister in the Queen Alexandra's Imperial Military nursing Service Reserve. 

 Sir Farquhar Buzzard, prominent British physician and Regius Professor of Medicine at the University of Oxford (1928–1943).

 Clinton Thomas Dent, surgeon, author and mountaineer.

 Robert Farquharson, Scottish doctor and Liberal politician, who served as the Member of Parliament (MP) for Aberdeenshire West.

 Alfred Morcom, medical doctor and first-class cricketer.

 Flora Murray, Scottish medical pioneer, and a member of the Women's Social and Political Union suffragettes.

Dan Leno
On 20 October 1904, the music hall star Dan Leno donated £625 to the hospital after his last show. He died 11 days later.

See also
 List of hospitals in England

References

Hospital buildings completed in 1926
Defunct hospitals in London
Health in the London Borough of Lambeth
History of the London Borough of Lambeth
Hospitals established in 1866
1990 disestablishments in England
Children's hospitals in the United Kingdom
Arts and Crafts architecture in England
Charles Holden buildings
Grade II* listed buildings in the London Borough of Lambeth
Voluntary hospitals